Black Cat Rebellion is an American punk rooted rock 'n' roll band formed in 2003 in Indianapolis, Indiana, United States, by Brad St. Patrick (vocals and guitars), and Rob Nüetzmann (bass). Many comparisons have been made to their sound, including: 1977 Punk, Garage, Post Punk, and Deathrock.

Career
The band tours frequently, from East to West coast, across the United States. Aside from their own tours, Black Cat has played many festivals; including the Heavy Rebel Weekender, Oranje, and Drop Dead Festival. They have also appeared as the soundtrack to an episode of ESPN 2's "Hot Rod Trucks" show. In print, the band has also appeared in several magazines, including Loud, Fast, Rules, Vive Le Rock, and PORK.

Discography
Ain't Got No Time — (2004) limited self-release - Out of print
Our Lives Like Daggers — (2006) Crypt of Blood Records - Out of print
Lovers Of The Bizarre — (2015) No Front Teeth Records (cd release), Man Della Records (vinyl release)
Ethereal Twin I — (2020) EP
Ethereal Twin II — (2021) EP (unreleased)

Members

Current
 Brad St. Patrick - Vocals and Guitar (2003–present)
 Rob Nüetzmann - Bass (2003-2007) (2010–present)
 Robert Trowbridge - Guitar (2018–present)
 Steve Prince - Drums (2017–present)

Former
 D. Zaster - Drums (2005-2006)
 Michael "Milk" Patton - Drums (2006-2007)
 Ben Galvin (2011-2013)
 Kurt Fester - Bass (2008-2009)
 Brian Nichols - Guitar (2010-2011)
 Patrick Meadows - Guitar (2012-2016)
 Chris Grady - Drums (2003-2006) (2008-2011)(2014-2017)
 Mike West - Guitar (2016-2017)

References

External links
Official Black Cat Rebellion site
Black Cat Rebellion Bandcamp

Punk rock groups from Indiana
American gothic rock groups
American death rock groups